Seh Qaleh District is a district (bakhsh) in Sarayan County, South Khorasan Province, Iran. At the 2006 census, its population was 11,334, in 2,664 families.  The District has one city: Seh Qaleh. The District has two rural districts (dehestan): Dokuheh Rural District and Seh Qaleh Rural District.

References 

Districts of South Khorasan Province
Sarayan County